is a 1982 arcade video game developed and released by Irem. It was licensed to Williams for distribution in North America. The player controls a moon buggy which can jump over and shoot obstacles on a horizontally scrolling landscape as well as shoot aerial attackers. Designed by Takashi Nishiyama, Moon Patrol is often credited with the introduction of full parallax scrolling in side-scrolling games. Most of the home ports were from Atari, Inc., sometimes under the Atarisoft label.

Gameplay

The player takes the role of a Luna City police officer assigned to Sector Nine, the home of the "toughest thugs in the galaxy". The player controls a Moon buggy that travels over the Moon's surface, viewed from the side as it moves toward the right. Craters, mines, and other obstacles on the ground must be shot or jumped over. Three types of flying UFOs attack from above and must be shot down. One of the flying enemies has a weapon which creates a crater when it hits the ground.

Gameplay is within a number of courses, each divided into 26 checkpoints named after the letters of the English alphabet. Of these, the five major checkpoints — E, J, O, T and, Z — denote a new "stage" with a new background and theme; for example, the third stage starts at J and introduces mines. The top portion of the screen shows a timeline-style map of the course, with the five major checkpoints clearly marked. Above the map is an indicator of the current checkpoint, the time spent in the stage, and three indicator lights: the top light indicates upcoming enemy aerial attacks, the middle one indicates an upcoming minefield, and the bottom one indicates enemies approaching from behind.

At the end of a stage, that time spent is compared to the average, and bonus points are awarded accordingly, at 1,000 plus 100 per second bettered; completing an entire course gives an additional 5,000 points plus 100 per second bettered. There are two unique courses: the "Beginner Course" and the "Champion Course". The Champion Course "loops" forever, and each loop is numbered for convenience, up to three.

Extra lives are given at 10,000, 30,000, and 50,000 points; thereafter, no more lives are given. The game ends when the last patrol car is destroyed. The game can be continued, but points scored from one game do not carry over. 999,990 points is the maximum high score that can be achieved; players can exceed this score, but it "turns over" if they do.

Ports
Atari, Inc. released Moon Patrol for the Apple II, Atari 8-bit family, Atari 2600, Atari 5200, Atari ST, Commodore 64, VIC-20, IBM PC (as a self-booting disk), and TI-99/4A. The versions for non-Atari systems were published under the Atarisoft label. The MSX conversion was published by Irem.

Reception
Moon Patrol was among the five top-grossing arcade games on North America's monthly RePlay charts by January 1983.

Moon Patrol received a Certificate of Merit in the category of "1984 Best Science Fiction/ Fantasy Video Game" at the 5th annual Arkie Awards. Arcade Express reviewed the arcade version in January 1983 and scored it 8 out of 10.

Scott Mace of InfoWorld stated that Moon Patrol for the Commodore 64 was his favorite Atarisoft game, making good use of the computer's sound. Computer Games magazine called the Commodore 64 conversion a "very good" shoot 'em up and the "thinking man's killing game" while noting it has a continue feature like Vanguard. They later gave the home computer conversions a B− rating. In March 1985, Computer & Video Games rated the Atari 800 version 33 out of 40 and listed it as the third best game of the month. In 1995, Flux magazine ranked the arcade version 86th on their "Top 100 Video Games."

Legacy
Moon Patrol was included in the retro compilations Arcade Hits: Moon Patrol & Spy Hunter for Game Boy Color and Midway Presents Arcade's Greatest Hits: The Midway Collection 2 for Dreamcast, PlayStation, and Microsoft Windows.
In 2006 Bandai released an enhanced version as Moon Patrol EX for cell phones.
Lunar Patrol J2ME was released in 2012 by GRP Software (Java ME and Symbian) with enhanced physics and playability.
On March 22, 2018, Moon Patrol was released for the Nintendo Switch by Hamster as part of the Arcade Archives series. A version was announced in 2018 for  the Intellivision Amico.

Clones
A bootleg version called Moon Ranger was released in the arcades the same year as Moon Patrol.

Home clones include  Desert Patrol for the TRS-80 Color Computer (1983), 
Gas Hog for the Atari 2600 (1983),
Lunar Rover Patrol for the Dragon 32 (1983),
Moon Buggy for the Commodore 64 (1983),
Moon Alert for the ZX Spectrum (1984),
Luna Rover for the ZX Spectrum (1985),
Moon Control for the Amstrad CPC (1985),
Moonrider for MSX (1986),
and Overlander for the Amiga (1993). Battle Through Time (1984) for the Commodore 64 re-themed the gameplay to be about major wars of the 20th century. A contemporaneous review for B.C.'s Quest for Tires (1983) remarked on the game's similarity to Moon Patrol.

Open-source clones named moon-buggy  and ASCII Patrol  run in Unix-like terminals.

Impact
Moon Patrol introduced full parallax scrolling. The arcade video game Jump Bug (1981) had previously used a limited form of parallax scrolling, with the main scene scrolling while the starry night sky is fixed and clouds move slowly. Moon Patrol has three separate background layers scrolling at different speeds, simulating the distance between them. Taito's Jungle King, also with parallax scrolling, was released a month after Moon Patrol.

The game's designer Takashi Nishiyama went on to create the beat 'em up game Kung-Fu Master (1984), which combined a shoot 'em up gameplay rhythm with fighting elements.

References

External links

Moon Patrol at the Arcade History database

1982 video games
Arcade video games
Apple II games
Atari 2600 games
Atari 5200 games
Atari 8-bit family games
Cancelled ZX Spectrum games
Commodore 64 games
VIC-20 games
Irem games
Mobile games
MSX games
Nintendo Switch games
PlayStation 4 games
Horizontally scrolling shooters
TI-99/4A games
Vehicular combat games
Video games about police officers
Video games developed in Japan
Video games set on the Moon
Williams video games
Hamster Corporation games